Quintin John Alohiokala Torres-Costa (born September 11, 1994) is an American former professional baseball pitcher.

Career

Milwaukee Brewers
Torres-Costa attended Waiakea High School in Hilo, Hawaii and played college baseball at the University of Hawaii at Manoa. He was drafted by the Milwaukee Brewers in the 35th round of the 2015 Major League Baseball draft. He signed and spent his first professional season with the Arizona League Brewers and Helena Brewers, compiling a 2-0 record and a 3.38 ERA in 14 relief appearances.

Torres-Costa spent 2016 with Helena and Wisconsin Timber Rattlers, going a combined 6-3 with a 3.92 ERA in 45 relief appearances, and 2017 with the Carolina Mudcats and Biloxi Shuckers, pitching to a 9-6 record and a 4.23 ERA in 41 appearances in relief. After the 2017 season, he played in the Arizona Fall League. He started 2018 with Biloxi and was promoted to the Colorado Springs Sky Sox during the season. In 43 relief appearances between the two clubs, Torres-Costa was 3-2 with a 1.31 ERA.

Torres-Costa underwent Tommy John Surgery during the offseason, forcing him to miss all of 2019. He did not play a minor league game in 2020 due to the cancellation of the minor league season caused by the COVID-19 pandemic. In 2021, he made 35 relief appearances with the Triple-A Nashville Sounds and accumulated a 6.81 ERA before being released on August 30.

Gastonia Honey Hunters
On March 16, 2022, Torres-Costa signed with the Gastonia Honey Hunters of the Atlantic League of Professional Baseball. He announced his retirement on August 29, 2022.

References

External links

1994 births
Living people
Minor league baseball players
Arizona League Brewers players
Biloxi Shuckers players
Carolina Mudcats players
Colorado Springs Sky Sox players
Glendale Desert Dogs players
Hawaii Rainbow Warriors baseball players
Helena Brewers players
Nashville Sounds players
Salt River Rafters players
Wisconsin Timber Rattlers players
Gastonia Honey Hunters players